Susan Sunderland born Susan Sykes and known as the Calderdale Nightingale (30 April 1819 – 7 May 1905) was a British singer. Some years after she retired the annual Mrs Sunderland Music Festival was organised in Huddersfeld and it is still running in the 21st century.

Life
Sunderland was born in Brighouse in 1819. Her parents were Hannah and Sykes, a butcher. Her soprano voice was discovered in 1831. She was trained by the choirmaster of Brighouse parish church who was also a blacksmith.

She was fifteen when she gave her first concert. Opportunities outside the area were restricted as there were no railways at the time. When she gave a concert in Huddersfield or performed as principal soprano at St Paul's Church there she walked thirty miles that day, often arriving home at two hours after midnight.  In 2020 the church is now a concert hall.

The annual "Mrs Sunderland Music Festival"
In 1888 she had been married for fifty years and a celebration was organised, at which she was given an illuminated manuscript to celebrate her skills. After this a group of people decided that there should be an annual competition to find more leading women soloists. In April 1889 the first annual "Mrs Sunderland Festival" took place in Huddersfield with Mrs Sunderland presenting the prizes to the winners. It was a singing competition initially for female soloists but it was expanded to include pianists and violin players on alternate years. The music festival has expanded further and in the 21st century it occupies nine days at Huddersfield Town Hall. The festival in February 2020 was the 131st and it included choirs, ensembles, instrumentalists and spoken performances including those in the local dialect.

Private life
She married Henry Sunderland in 1838. They had six children and never moved house all their lives.

References

1819 births
1905 deaths
People from Brighouse
19th-century British women singers